"∞1" (read "Infinity Ichi"; translated as "Infinity 1") is Do As Infinity's twenty-first single, released on June 17, 2009. The band had disbanded in September 2005, but reformed three years later in September 2008. This is the first new single the band released after reforming, and is the first single by the band not to have Dai Nagao. The single contains four songs, though none are named "∞1", and this is the first Do As Infinity single not to contain instrumental versions of any song. A music video directed by Kensuke Kawamura was produced for "Umareyuku Monotachi e".

Track listing

Chart positions

References

External links
"∞1" at Avex Network
"∞1" at Oricon

2009 singles
Do As Infinity songs
Song recordings produced by Seiji Kameda